I've Got Something To Tell You  is British television series that has aired on the W channel from 3 October to 7 November 2016. The programme, presented by Amanda Holden, aims to reunite people offering support as friends, partners and relations break life-changing news to loved ones in front of the cameras.

Synopsis
With the help of Amanda Holden the series offers a platform for people who are desperate to tell something to someone. It gives an insight into others lives and emotions, as they tell their loved ones something they have been putting off for a while.  Amanda is seen watching from the sideline acting as a waitress and mediator, offering support when needed. All confessions are made public in the setting of an English country retreat.

References

External links

2016 British television series debuts
2016 British television series endings
2010s British reality television series
English-language television shows
UKTV original programming